This is a list of the tallest structures in Morocco, including dams and radio antenna as well as buildings. Many of the structures listed are located in Casablanca.
The list is sorted by official height; where two or more structures share the same height, equal ranking is given and the structures are then listed in alphabetical order.

Tallest structures

Tallest skyscrapers

Under construction

On-hold, approved or proposed

See also 

 List of tallest buildings in Morocco
 List of tallest skyscrapers in Morocco

References 

Morocco
Morocco
Tallest